The Northern Regional Minister is the Ghana government official who is responsible for overseeing the administration of the Northern Region of Ghana. The boundaries of the Northern Region have changed at various times in Ghana's history. Following the December 2018 referendums, the North East Region has been carved out of it. There are currently sixteen administrative regions in Ghana.

List of Northern Regional Ministers

See also

Ministers of the Ghanaian Government
Northern Region

Notes

Politics of Ghana
Northern Regional Minister